Prince Vladimir Petrovich Meshchersky (11 January 1839 – 23 July 1914) was a Russian journalist and novelist who, throughout his career, wielded significant political clout. 

He was the grandson of historian Nikolay Karamzin.

A strong supporter of the role of the landed gentry in politics and administration, Meshchersky "turned politics into an industry with which he traded in the most shameless manner for the benefit of himself and his favourites"  – young men whose careers he advanced. A friend of composer Pyotr Ilyich Tchaikovsky, he acquired a reputation as a homosexual philanderer. His patrons, the Tsars Alexander III and Nicholas II, protected him from public disgrace.

He was the editor of Grazhdanin (The Citizen), a traditional conservative newspaper which received subsidies from the imperial authorities. According to Leon Trotsky, "The sole paper which [Tsar] Nicholas read for years, and from which he derived his ideas, was a weekly published on state revenue by Prince Meshchersky, a vile, bribed journalist of the reactionary bureaucratic clique, despised even in his own circle."

Meshchersky also contributed to the periodicals The Russian Messenger and Moskovskiye Vedomosti (Moscow News). He was the author of several novels and memoirs.

References 

 Out of My Past: The Memoirs of Count Kokovtsov Edited by H.H. Fisher and translated by Laura Matveev; Stanford University Press, 1935.

1839 births
1914 deaths
Journalists from the Russian Empire
Novelists from the Russian Empire
Russian gay writers
Russian LGBT novelists
Russian LGBT journalists
People from the Russian Empire of Tatar descent
Gay journalists
Gay novelists
Burials at the Isidorovskaya Church of the Alexander Nevsky Lavra
Magazine founders from the Russian Empire